The Division of Corinella has twice been used as the name of an Australian Electoral Division in Victoria:

 Division of Corinella (1901–06)
 Division of Corinella (1990–96)